Edvard Askeland (born 10 December 1954) is a Norwegian jazz bassist, known from a series of album releases in various genres and for being regular in Dag Arnesens lineups in 1970-80, and within Cutting Edge.

Career 
Askeland was born in Bergen, Norway. He was educated at Bergen Lærerhøgskole, and University of Oslo (Bachelor in music). During his musical period in Bergen he played within different Dag Arnesen lineups, within «Danmarksplass Jazz & Rock» and «Bergen Blues Band» (1974–80), to mention a few. After moving to Oslo in 1980, he joined the band «Country Team» (1980–82) and various jazz bands, like «Eim», Søyr and Frode Thingnæs Big Band. The contributions in the renowned Cutting Edge resulted in four record releases during the 1980'es with Knut Værnes, Morten Halle, Rune Klakegg, Frank Jakobsen and Stein Inge Brækhus. In 2004 he established the Bass Ensemble «BassoNova» together with Stein Erik Tafjord. He also has played on tour with Morten Halle Quartet, and was in the lineup for Van Morrison at Vossajazz in 1988.

In other genres, he has contributed on among others Alarmen går (1982) with Jan Eggum, and Fra nei til ja (1994) with Ole Paus.
Poems by Hans Børli was released on Prøv å sette vinger på en stein (1996) with Katja Medbøe. He was central in Kjell Habbestad's Noahs draum (1998). Askeland composed music to texts by the poet Olav H. Hauge on Under stjernone (2005), where Hildegun Riise recite poems, Per Jørgensen play trumpet, Eivind Aarset (guitar) and Paolo Vinaccia (drums). This material was premiered at Vossajazz in 2005.

Askeland was awarded Gammleng-prisen class studio in 1993 and from April 2007 General Manager of Oslo Jazzfestival.

Honors 
Gammleng-prisen 1993 in the class Studio musician

Discography (in selection) 

Within Cutting Edge
1982: Cutting Edge (Odin)
1984: Our Man In Paradise (Odin)
1986: Duesenberg (Curling Legs)
1995: Alle Tre (Curling Legs), Compilation

With Jan Eggum
1984: Alarmen Går (Karussell), with Jan Eggum
1985: E.G.G.U.M (Grappa Music), within «Cutting Edge»
1996: Dacapo (Grappa Music)

With other projects
1975: Kjerringrokk Om Kvinner (Polydor), with «Kjerringrokk»
1980: Bergen Blues Band (Harvest, EMI Norge), within «Bergen Blues Band»
1982: Ny Bris (Odin), with Dag Arnesen on "En Sint Glad Marsj - Mot Swingen"
1984: Cierny Peter (Mai), within Søyr
1985: Reisefeber (Slager Records), with Steinar Ofsdal
1992: Wenches Jul (Slager Records), with Wenche Myhre (Children Choir: Anine Kruse, Benedikte Kruse, Christina Møllen, Live Maartmann, Lotte Gjøstøl)
1993: Våre Beste Barnesanger II (Grappa Music)
1993: Live At Gildevangen (Bare Bra Musikk), with Harald Heide-Steen Jr. alias Sylfest Strutle
1996: Prøv å sette vinger på en stein, Kirkelig Kulturverksted, poems by Hans Børli
1998: Livsglede (AMK 9801), with Anne-Marie Kvien
2000: Tein (Anchi Litt Av Hvert...), with Anne Grimstad Fjeld
2002: Nære Ting (Traffic Trading ), with Tor Endresen & Rune Larsen

References

External links 
Edvard Askeland general manager for Oslo Jazzfestival at Ballade.no

1954 births
Living people
20th-century Norwegian bass guitarists
21st-century Norwegian bass guitarists
20th-century Norwegian upright-bassists
21st-century Norwegian upright-bassists
20th-century Norwegian male musicians
21st-century Norwegian male musicians
Jazz double-bassists
Male double-bassists
Male jazz musicians
Norwegian male bass guitarists
Norwegian jazz upright-bassists
Norwegian jazz bass guitarists
Norwegian classical upright-bassists
Musicians from Bergen
Bergen University College alumni
Cutting Edge (band) members
Søyr members